Luther Burbank: His Methods and Discoveries, Their Practical Application is one of the first sets of books published using color photography and is the most-extensive publication of the work of Luther Burbank (1849–1926).

Luther Burbank history
Luther Burbank: His Methods and Discoveries is a twelve-volume set published by the Luther Burbank Press in 1914 and 1915. The set was sold by subscription.

Each volume has 105 color photographs tipped in, for a total of 1260 photographs. The photos provide an extensive record of Burbank’s work in Santa Rosa and Sebastopol from 1875 to 1914.

The books apparently had at least six writers including Oscan Binner, Edward J. Wickson and Henry Smith Williams, M.D., LL.D.  George Shull reported that “considerable sections are most word for word the same as my manuscript.”  Further, Shull found the text wanting:  "It appears to me a criminal waste of good paper...  The colored plates will prove both interesting and valuable."

Production
Sold by subscription, four quality levels of binding were offered:  simple cloth, suede, embossed cloth and leather.

The simple-cloth-bound edition was offered in multiple colors:  red, blue, green and gold. Each volume has a black & white photo of Burbank inserted in the front of each cover. The books sold for $180 per set, “when $180 represented the earnings of two months’ work or longer.” 

In the same format as the simple-cloth-bound edition, a suede leather version was offered.  The leather was light in weight and not nearly as sturdy as the full leather editions, below.

The embossed-cloth edition has a cherry design.

The leather-bound edition has a two-tree design with tall trees in panels separated by a blank panel on the front covers. The first volume is endorsed to its buyer and has an original signature of Luther Burbank.

An unusual leather-bound edition with a path scene with stone posts, a gate and trees on along the paths the covers was used for presentation purposes.  These sets do not have the Luther Burbank signature.

Another unusual leather-bound edition has a grape vine with grapes on a T-trellis on the covers.  These have very heavy (wood?) boards.

Special paper was prepared for the volumes which was watermarked “The Luther Burbank Press.”

Color photography

The volumes are one of the first uses of color photography and color printing.  Since a nationwide search failed to find suitable color printing technology, The Luther Burbank Press set up a photo-chemical laboratory using the process of Lumiere of Paris.  The last volume has a section which describes how color photography and color printing is accomplished.

Chapters
The twelve volumes are
{|
|----- valign="top"
|
Volume I (1914)
How the Cactus Got Its Spines – And How It Lost Them
Twenty-three Potato Seeds – And What They Taught
No Two Living Things Exactly Alike
The Rivalry of Plants To Please Us
Let Us Now Produce a New Pink Daisy
Short-Cuts Into Centuries to Come
How Far Can Plant Improvement Go?
Some Plants Which Are Begging for Immediate Improvement
Piecing the Fragments of a Motion Picture FilmVolume IV (1914)Quick Possibilities in Fruit Improvement
Practical Orchard Plans and Methods
Doubling the Productiveness of the Cherry
The Responsiveness of the Pear
Fuzzy Peach and Smooth-Skinned Nectarine
The Apple – A Fruit Worthy of Still Further Improvement
The Transformation of the Quince
The Apricot and the Loquat
Citrus Fruits – And Fruits From the TropicsVolume VII (1914)How to Get the Most Out of the Garden
Some Common Garden Plants and Their Improvement
Peas and Beans as Money Crops
The Tomato – and an Interesting Experiment
Pink Chives – and Other Foods for Flavor
Artichokes – and Some Garden Specialties
Winter Rhubarb – and Other Interesting Exotics
The Camassia – Will it Supplant the Potato?
The Potato Itself – Who Will Improve It Further?Volume X (1915)Getting the Utmost Variation Out of A Flower
Improvement in the Much Improved Iris
The Tigridia and Some Interesting Hybrids
Four Common Dooryard Flowers – And Their Improvements
The Everlasting Flower, and Some Common Exotica
The Hybrid Larkspur – and Other Transformations
Ornamental Palms and Climbing Vines
Laws and Their Beautification
Field and Flower Garden
|Volume II (1914)The Shasta Daisy
The White Blackberry
The Scented Calla
The Stoneless Plum
The Royal Walnut
The Winter Rhubarb
The Burbank Cherry
The Sugar Prune
Some Interesting FailuresVolume V (1914)How the Plum Followed the Potato
Four Burbank Plums, and How They Were Made
The Greatest Plum of All – The Prune
Four Burbank Prunes, and The Work Behind Them
Plums and Prunes Without Stones and Seeds
Planning and Ideal Plum or Prune
New Plums and Prunes in The Process of Making
What the Burbank Plums and Prunes Have Earned
Accomplishing the Impossible – The PlumcotVolume VIII (1914)Corn – The King of America’s Crops
Getting the Most Out of the Small Grains
Manufacturing Food for the Live Stock
A Rich Field for Work on the Textile Plants
Plants Which Yield Useful Chemical Substances
Reclaiming the Deserts with Cactus
Rival of Alfalfa
Many Useful Substances in Cactus
Other Useful Plants Which Will Repay ExperimentVolume XI (1915)Nuts as a Profitable Crop
The Paper Shell, and Other Walnuts
The Almond – and Its Improvement
The Chestnut – Bearing Nuts at Six Months
The Hickory Nut, and Other Nuts
The On Growing Trees for Lumber
The Production of a Quick-growing Walnut
Trees Whose Products are Useful Substances
Trees and Shrubs for Shade and Ornamentals
|Volume III (1914)Planning A New Plant
Plant Affinities
Practical Pollination
Quantity Production
Grafting and Budding
Letting the Bees Do Their Work
Fixing Good Traits
Recording the Experiments
Final SelectionVolume VI (1914)The Thornless Blackberry – And Others
The Raspberry and Some Odd Crosses
Designing a Strawberry to Bear the Year Around
The Sunberry – A Production from the Wild
A Dozen Other Delightful Berries
Great Opportunities In the Grape
The Cactus Pear – A Profitable Fruit
Some Inedible Fruits Which May Be Transformed
The Need for Improving Small FruitsVolume IX (1914)What to Work for in Flowers
Working With a Universal Flower – The Rose
Accomplishing the Impossible With the Amaryllis
Bringing Forth an Entirely New Color
A Daisy Which Rivals the Chrysanthemum
Making the Gladiolus Surpass Itself
Experimenting With the Responsive Dahlia
The Canna and the Calia
The Purest White in NatureVolume XII (1915)'Luther Burbank – His Boyhood on a Massachusetts Farm
Luther Burbank – The Early Years in Santa Rosa
Luther Burbank – His Patience Rewarded
Luther Burbank – The Sum of His Work With Plant Life
Luther Burbank – The Bearing of His Work on Human Life
The Luther Burbank Society
(includes explanation of color photography)
|}

How Plants are Trained to Work for ManHow Plants are Trained to Work for Man'' by Luther Burbank, Sc.D published in 1921 is clearly a rework of the 1914–1915 work.

The 1921 publication is in eight volumes in a single binding.  Each volume contains 49 photographs printed on separate pages, not the tipped-in photos of the original.

Despite Burbank's claim that, "these eight volumes are not a compilation from the works or words of others," the books cite the copyrights from 1914 and 1915 from the Luther Burbank Company.

All but two of the photographs in the 1921 volumes came from the 1914–1915 volumes.  Generally, photographs in the first volumes of the early set are found in the first volumes of the later set, with this trend continuing to the last volumes.

The "Sc.D" is from the honorary doctor of science degree awarded Burbank by Tufts University in 1905.

References

External links

 University of Wisconsin Digital Collection 
 Online - Luther Burbank:  His Methods and Discoveries 
 Online - How Plants are Trained to Work for Man 

1914 non-fiction books
1915 non-fiction books
American non-fiction books
Gardening books